Oru West is a Local Government Area of Imo State, Nigeria. Its headquarters are in the town of Mgbidi.
 

Oru-west has common boundaries with Oguta local government, Oru-east and Anambra state.

The postal code of the area is 474.

Oru- west is made up of different autonomous communities ; Mgbidi, Ozara, Aji, Umu owa, Nempi, Ohakpu, Elele, Ibi asoegbe, Otulu etc

References

Local Government Areas in Imo State
Local Government Areas in Igboland
Towns in Imo State

3. ^https://www.medianigeria.com/list-of-towns-and-villages-in-oru-west-l-g-a-imo-state/. 

List of villages in Oru-west.Retrieved 2023-2-27